Nick Hardwick may refer to:

Nick Hardwick (American football), American football player
Nick Hardwick (executive), former Chief Inspector of Prisons in the United Kingdom